Star Awards 2011 (Chinese: 红星大奖 2011) was a double television award ceremony held in Singapore. It is part of the annual Star Awards organised by MediaCorp for the two free-to-air channels, MediaCorp Channel 8 and MediaCorp Channel U.

As like the preceding year's ceremony, this year's Star Awards were broadcast in two live-telecast shows on Channel 8, on 17 and 24 April. The first show, titled 银光闪耀 (lit. Blinding Silverlight) was broadcast live on 17 April 2011 at MediaCorp Studios, which primarily focuses on giving out mostly technical awards and the Favourite popularity awards which introduced since last year. The second show, titled 金碧辉映 (lit. Golden Splendour) was broadcast live on 24 April 2011 at the Grand Ballroom in Resorts World Sentosa, which was the main award ceremony, followed by a post-show party (telecast on Channel U) after the ceremony concluded.

The year's leading contender, Breakout (which had 19 nominations), became the biggest winning drama serial of the year, clinching a total of five awards including the Best Drama Serial. Comedy satire Black Rose broke a record of having the most nominations by variety/info-ad programme in a single year with seven, but cooking documentary variety show Love On A Plate set another record of wins most awards for a Variety Programme, with four.

Programme details

Winners and nominees
Unless otherwise stated, winners are listed first, highlighted in boldface. A 1 next to the nomination indicate that a representative will collect the award in place of the nominee.

Show 1 (银光闪耀)
The show opened at 7.00pm with a two-and-a-half minute parody opening containing mashup of various Chinese programmes of 2010–11, and many dialogues or shots from a selected number of scenes are edited (to fit the Star Awards theme) and the voices are dubbed by different artistes (all nominees). When the show opens, the show hosts Dasmond Koh, Kym Ng, Bryan Wong and Pornsak were dubbed with voices of Wong, Pornsak, Koh and Ng, respectively, who then explaining the opening's disclaimer after the voices are fixed.

Main category

Awards Eligible for Audience Voting

Other awards

Rocket Award

Viewership awards
{| class="wikitable" style="text-align:center"
|-
| 
| ''With You  我在你左右|-
| 
| Life Transformers 2  心情大动员2'''
|-
|}

Show 2 (金碧辉映)
Main category

Trivia
Consecutive nominees and recipients
The nominations for the "Best Current Affairs Presenter" award are the same from last year.
Regene Lim received the "Young Talent Award" for the third consecutive year.

Firsts in top 10
 Huang Wenyong and Zhou Ying won their first Top 10 Most Popular Artiste, for the former, it was his first win after being nominated for 17 consecutive years. 
After Zheng Geping made his speech, he went on to thank his family.
 Michelle Chong and Ann Kok received her second and sixth, respectively, Top 10 Most Popular Female Artistes award since 2005 and 1999, respectively.

Star Awards 2012 nominations
The first show of 2011 won the Best Variety Special on the following ceremony next year; it was Star Awards third win for the Best Variety Special, and the second consecutive time on doing so.

See also
 MediaCorp Channel 8
 MediaCorp Channel U
 Star Awards

References

External links
Show 1 Nominees

2011 television awards
Star Awards